Vincenzo Galasso is Professor of economics at Bocconi University  focusing on political economics, political economy,

Early life, education, and professional experience
Born in Naples, Galasso read for a Bachelors in economics from Bocconi. He then proceeded to earn a PhD in Economics from UCLA. 

Galasso has taught economics at Universidad Carlos III in 1996; at Bocconi since 2002 where he was an associate professor of economics. He briefly assumed professorship at Università della Svizzera Italiana from September 2011 to 2013.

He is the Director  of the Analysis in Pension Economics (APE) research unit of Baffi-CAREFIN. He is a co-Editor of the European Journal of Political Economy and an Editor of the Journal of Pension Economics and Finance.

Academic contributions
Galasso has studied the political economy of structural reforms, the political economy of the US Social Security reform.

References

External links
 Faculty page
 Vincenzo Galasso on IDEAS/RePEc

Italian economists
Political economists
University of California, Los Angeles alumni
Bocconi University alumni
Academic staff of Bocconi University 
Living people
1967 births